Sympistis confusa is a moth of the family Noctuidae first described by Christian Friedrich Freyer in 1842. It is found in Iran, Iraq, Asia Minor, northwards to Turkmenistan, the European part of southeast Russia and the Black Sea shores of Bulgaria.

Adults are on wing from June to August. There is one generation per year.

Subspecies
Sympistis confusa confusa
Sympistis confusa persica
Sympistis confusa michaelorum (Bulgaria)

References

External links

confusa
Moths of Europe
Moths of Asia
Moths described in 1842